Jordan Davies (born 1992) is an Ibiza Weekender and Ex on the Beach contestant.

Jordan Davies may also refer to:
Jordan Davies (footballer), professional footballer
Jordan Lee Davies, contestant on The Voice UK
Jordan Davies (presenter) on Soap Fever
Jordan Davies (rugby union) in 2015 Salford Red Devils season

See also
Jordan Davis (disambiguation)
Jordan, Daviess County, Indiana, an unincorporated community